"Save Our Love" is a song by British R&B girl group Eternal. It was released in January 1994 as the second single from their debut album, Always & Forever (1993). The single entered at number 12 on the UK Singles Chart on 15 January, climbing to its peak of number eight the following week, and remained in the UK top 75 for seven weeks. On the UK Dance Singles Chart, it was even more successful, reaching number six. A music video was filmed for the song in December 1993.

Critical reception
Pan-European magazine Music & Media commented, "They promised to stay with us forever and always, and judged by the quality of this second single, these new jill swingers won't be out of sight and hearing for a long time." Alan Jones from Music Week rated the song four out of five, adding, "Eternal's glossy and soulful sheen is impeccably stamped all over a chiming mid-tempo cut that may not be as addictive as "Stay", but is nevertheless uplifting and radio friendly. More propulsive and muscular mixes have already powered this to the top of the Club Chart, and pop success is assured." A reviewer from People Magazine described it as "intoxicating", noting that Eternal "creates a pre-disco sound that calls to mind the Honey Cone and the Three Degrees." 

Tim Jeffery from the RM Dance Update complimented the club remix by West End, stating that they are "transforming this pop swing thing into a chugging funky semi-house track that will give Eternal an airing on the dancefloor. Commercial of course, and very catchy, especially the constantly repeated chorus". Mark Frith from Smash Hits gave the song five out of five, writing, "Now, this is the stuff. Save Our Love begins with chiming bells and goes into a swing beaty groove before giving way to a wonderful anthemic pop chorus that's shouted with gusto. It sounds incredible — and that's just on it first play. A few more listens and you realise it's a truly great, cool and bang up-to-date pop record, the sort you'll remember as one of your favourites of the year next Christmas. That good. Top 3 at least, but it could go to the top."

Track listings
 UK and Australian CD single
 "Save Our Love" (7-inch mix) – 3:46
 "If You Need Me Tonight" – 3:59
 "Save Our Love" (West End mix) – 4:33
 "Save Our Love" (original mix) – 4:29

 UK 7-inch and cassette single
 "Save Our Love" (7-inch mix)
 "If You Need Me Tonight"
 "Hey Baby"

 UK 12-inch single
A1. "Save Our Love" (Jervier Roadhouse mix)
A2. "Save Our Love" (Simon Law mix)
A3. "Save Our Love" (West End D'Lick mix)
B1. "Save Our Love" (West End D'Rhythm mix)
B2. "Save Our Love" (West End D'Song mix)

Credits and personnel
Credits are lifted from the Always & Forever album booklet.

Studio
 Recorded at Prime Time Studios (Los Angeles)

Personnel
 Scott Cutler – writing, production
 Anne Preven – writing
 Eddie Chacon – writing
 Peter Pritchard – keyboards, programming
 West End – additional production and remix
 Barney – mix engineering

Charts

References

1993 songs
1994 singles
EMI Records singles
Eternal (band) songs
First Avenue Records singles
Songs written by Anne Preven
Songs written by Eddie Chacon
Songs written by Scott Cutler